Cape Cod Regional Transit Authority (CCRTA) operates a bus transit system of fixed and flexible routes, seasonal rail service to Boston, and a paratransit service in the Cape Cod region of Massachusetts. The CCRTA was created under the provisions of Chapter 161B of the Massachusetts General Laws in 1976. Its main hub and base of operations is the Hyannis Transportation Center on Main Street in Hyannis, Massachusetts.

Scheduled route service (called The Breeze until early 2008) consists of seven year-round lines covering every town on mainland Cape Cod. During the summer months (late June through early September) service runs seven days a week from approximately 5:30 am until midnight, and is complemented by local shuttles in downtown Hyannis, Provincetown, and Woods Hole. Service is somewhat reduced in the shoulder season (Memorial Day to late June and Labor Day to Columbus Day) and is limited in the off season when four of the eight routes do not run and the remainder only operate 5:30 am to 8 pm, Monday through Friday with most routes having reduced service on Saturday.

Service information

The Flex
The Flex is unique in that passengers may board or disembark up to 3/4 mile from the actual route itself. Off-route pickups can be  scheduled by calling CCRTA customer service. Higher fares apply when boarding or disembarking off-route.

DART
DART or "Dial a Ride Transportation" (formerly known as the "B-Bus") is the authority's federally mandated door to door paratransit service. Unlike many transit agencies (such as MBTA's  THE RIDE) riders do not need to qualify on the basis of disability or income, and any person who resides within CCRTA's service area can utilize DART. Fares are $3 each way or $1.50 for seniors and disabled, and unlike fixed route service, DART can be scheduled on Sundays.

CapeFLYER
The CapeFLYER service is scheduled passenger rail service that runs between South Station in Boston and the Hyannis Transportation Center. The service operates on Friday evenings and on weekends from Memorial Day through Labor Day.

Fares
Distance based fares were eliminated in 2006. RFID equipped electronic fareboxes were introduced in 2012. Passengers may now pay their fares with an MBTA Charlie Card or cash. As of January 2013, CCRTA fares are as follows:

*Valid for 31 days after initial validation.

Free transfers are available between the WOOSH and Sealine as well as the H2O East and West but not between other routes. Daily and monthly passes are valid on all routes, however a surcharge of $2.00 ($1.00 senior/ disabled) is collected for pass holders riding the Flex who board or disembark off-route.

References

External links
 

1976 establishments in Massachusetts
Bus transportation in Massachusetts
Government agencies established in 1976
State agencies of Massachusetts
Transportation in Barnstable County, Massachusetts